A harbinger is a forerunner or forewarning, but may also refer to:

Companies 
 Harbinger Corp., an Internet-oriented business
 Harbinger Capital, a hedge fund
 Harbinger Knowledge Products, an eLearning products and content services company

Fiction 
 Harbinger (DC Comics), a character in Crisis on Infinite Earths
 Harbinger (Valiant Comics series), a comic book published by Valiant Comics
 Harbingers (comics), fictional characters in Valiant Comics
 Harbinger (Star Trek novel), a 2005 novel in the Star Trek: Vanguard series by David Mack
 "Harbinger" (Star Trek: Enterprise), a 2004 third-season episode of Star Trek: Enterprise
 The Harbinger (novel), a 2011 novel by Jonathan Cahn
 Harbingers (novel), a 2006 novel by F. Paul Wilson
 Harbinger, Earl a character in the Monster Hunter series by Larry Correia
 Harbinger (film), a 2016 American eco-thriller film

Games 
 Harbinger (video game)
 Star Trek: Deep Space Nine: Harbinger, computer game
 Harbinger, product in the Dungeons & Dragons Miniatures Game series
 Harbinger, a starship in the game Star Wars: Knights of the Old Republic 2
 Harbinger, a playable character in the game Bloodline Champions
 Harbinger, a sentient starship in the Mass Effect series
 Harbinger, a soul of the mage class in the game Rift (video game)
 Harbinger, an allied support bomber aeroplan in the game Red Alert 3: Uprising Project Harbinger, a top-secret research program in the game series F.E.A.R.
 The Harbingers, an Australian video board game

 Music 
 Harbinger (band), 1997 musical group formed in Berkeley, California
 The Harbinger (album), a 2009 album by Molotov Solution
 Harbinger (Paula Cole album)
 Harbinger (Dan Seals album)
 "Harbinger", a track on the album Music of the Spheres by Mike Oldfield
 "Harbinger", a track on the album Nocturne by The Human Abstract
 "Harbinger", a track on the album Lowborn by Anberlin
 "Harbinger", a track on the album Pacific Myth by Protest the Hero

 Periodicals 
 Harbinger (zine), a philosophical publication
 The Harbinger, the Algonquin Regional High School newspaper
 The Harbinger, a 19th-century activist journal also known as The Phalanx 

Places
 Montes Harbinger, a cluster of mountains on the Moon
 Harbinger, North Carolina, an unincorporated community
 Harbinger, a former commune, now Harbin Hot Springs, a non-profit hot spring retreat and workshop center in Northern California

Other uses
 Harbinger (horse), thoroughbred racehorse
 Czerwiński-Shenstone Harbinger, a British sailplane, of which two were built